Philip F. Spaulding (1912–2005) was a well-known naval architect who lived and worked in Seattle, Washington. He played an immense role in shaping North America's ferries for more than half a century, and he also designed many yachts along the way.

Detail

Philip Spaulding was born on November 27, 1912 and died on May 5, 2005 at the age of 92. In 1952 he founded the marine design firm Philip F. Spaulding and Associates, which he led until his retirement in 1980. Spaulding was commissioned to design many ferries and other ships used on North America's West coast. Ships designed by Spaulding are still used to this day by the Alaska Marine Highway, Washington State Ferries, BC Ferries, and Golden Gate Ferries, in San Francisco. In 1987, many years after a merger and name change to Nickum and Spaulding Associates, the company was renamed Elliott Bay Design Group and its assets were sold to its employees.

BC Ferries

References
 
 Flickr group for ships by Spaudling

1912 births
2005 deaths
American naval architects
Engineers from Washington (state)
People from Seattle